The Pittsburgh Keystones was the name of two historic professional Negro league baseball teams that operated in 1887 and again in 1921 and 1922. The first team was a member of the first black baseball league in 1887, the League of Colored Baseball Clubs. The league only lasted a week, which resulted in a 3-4 record for the Keystones, and included Weldy Walker, the second African-American to play in the major leagues and future hall of famer, Sol White.

The second club was founded by Alexander McDonald Williams, a Barbadian immigrant and pool hall operator.  The Keystones' home field was Central Park, located in the Hill District at the corner of Chauncey Street and Humber Way. The park was built by the prominent African American architect Louis Arnett Stuart Bellinger, who would later design Greenlee Field for the Pittsburgh Crawfords.

In their first season the Pittsburgh Keystones played as associate members of the Negro National League.  Managed by Fred Downer, they compiled a 7-14-1 record against league and other associate clubs.  The Keystones joined the league as full members in 1922, finishing sixth with a 14-23-2 record in league play under managers Dizzy Dismukes and Dicta Johnson. The team disbanded after the season.

Year-by-year record

Players
William Wilson
 Vic Harris

References

African-American history in Pittsburgh
Negro league baseball teams
Keystones
Defunct baseball teams in Pennsylvania
Professional baseball teams in Pennsylvania
Keystones
Baseball teams disestablished in 1922
Baseball teams established in 1887